Niko Rak (born 26 July 2003) is a Croatian footballer who plays for plays for Turkish club Konyaspor as a midfielder.

Club career
On 28 August 2020 he played his first match for Šibenik, coming on as a substitute for Mario Ćurić in the 79th minute in a match against Gorica. On 7 August 2021 he made his first start for Šibenik in a match against Slaven Belupo.

International career
Niko Rak has played internationally for Croatia at under-16, under-17 and under-19 levels.

References

External links
 

2003 births
Living people
Sportspeople from Šibenik
Association football midfielders
Croatian footballers
Croatia youth international footballers
HNK Šibenik players
Croatian Football League players